The 1987 National Soccer League First Division was the third edition of the NSL First Division in South Africa. It was won by Jomo Cosmos.

Table

References

NSL First Division seasons